Victory Bridge may refer to:

 Victory Bridge (Yerevan), in Yerevan, Armenia
 Victory Bridge (New Jersey), in Middlesex County, New Jersey
 Victory Bridge (Florida), in Sneads, Florida
 Veresk Bridge, which was known in World War II as the "Bridge of Victory"